The women's  100 metre freestyle event at the 1975 World Aquatics Championships took place 22 July.

Results

Heats

Swim-off

Final

References

FINA Official

Swimming at the 1975 World Aquatics Championships